B.A.D. Cats is an American action/police drama that aired on ABC from January until February 1980 on Friday nights at 8 PM Eastern time. The series stars Asher Brauner, Steve Hanks, and Michelle Pfeiffer in one of her first major acting roles.

The acronym B.A.D. Cats stood for 'Burglary Auto Detail, Commercial Auto Thefts'.

Synopsis
Nick Donovan (Brauner) and Ocee James (Hanks) were two former race car drivers who joined the LAPD as part of the B.A.D. C.A.T. squad (which stood for Burglary Auto Detail Commercial Auto Thefts). Using their superior driving skills, the two mainly saw fit to run the bad guys off the road rather than question them. Their superior, Captain Nathan (Vic Morrow) publicly chastised the two, but privately encouraged their "loose cannon" style. Officer Samantha Jensen (Pfeiffer) would occasionally lend a hand when a more feminine approach was called for. Also seen were Ma (LaWanda Page), who owned a bar which the boys frequented, and Rodney (Jimmie Walker), a former car thief trying to get on the straight and narrow.

Cast
 Asher Brauner as Officer Nick Donovan
 Steve Hanks as Officer Ocee James
 Vic Morrow as Captain Eugene Nathan
 LaWanda Page as Ma
 Michelle Pfeiffer as Samantha "Sunshine" Jensen
 Penny Santon as Mrs. Bernardi
 Jimmie Walker as Rodney Washington

Episodes

External links
 

1980 American television series debuts
1980 American television series endings
American Broadcasting Company original programming
1980s American crime drama television series
American action television series
English-language television shows
Fictional portrayals of the Los Angeles Police Department
Television series by Spelling Television
Television shows set in Los Angeles